Events in the year 1935 in Spain.

Incumbents
President: Niceto Alcalá-Zamora
Prime Minister: 
 until 26 September: Alejandro Lerroux 
 26 September-15 December: Joaquín Chapaprieta
 starting 15 December: Manuel Portela Valladares

Births
March 30 - Eusebio Ríos, football player and manager (d. 2008)
June 30 - Lola Herrera, actress
August 30 - Felipe Fernández García, Catholic bishop (d. 2012)
December 2 - José Antonio González Casanova, lawyer and politician (d. 2021)

Deaths
 5 March – Roque Ruaño, priest and civil engineer (b. 1877)
 12 March – Patricio Arabolaza. (b. 1893)

See also
List of Spanish films of the 1930s

References

 
Years of the 20th century in Spain
1930s in Spain
Spain
Spain